Mahdi al-Mashat (born 1986) is a Yemeni political figure from the Houthi movement. After the death of Saleh Ali al-Sammad on 19 April 2018, he became Chairman of the Supreme Political Council. He is the representative of Abdul-Malik al-Houthi, the leader of the movement and director of his office.

In July 2021, the Supreme Political Council prolonged his tenure for three more years.

References

1986 births
Living people
Houthi members
Presidents of Yemen
People from Saada Governorate
Yemeni military personnel of the Yemeni Civil War (2014–present)
Field marshals of Yemen